WWE No Way Out was a professional wrestling pay-per-view (PPV) event produced by WWE, a professional wrestling promotion based in Connecticut. It was first held as the 20th In Your House PPV in February 1998 and was titled No Way Out of Texas. It returned as its own PPV in February 2000, with the event's title truncated to "No Way Out," and it continued as the annual February PPV until 2009. The events in 2008 and 2009 featured the Elimination Chamber match. In turn, No Way Out was replaced by a new annual PPV titled Elimination Chamber in 2010, but one further No Way Out PPV was held as a one-off event in June 2012 to replace Capitol Punishment. In 2013, No Way Out was again discontinued and it was replaced by Payback.

The first four events were held when the promotion was still called the World Wrestling Federation (WWF). In May 2002, the promotion was renamed to World Wrestling Entertainment (WWE). To coincide with the brand extension that was also introduced in 2002, No Way Out was held exclusively for wrestlers of the SmackDown! brand from 2004 to 2007. Following WrestleMania 23 in April 2007, brand-exclusive pay-per-views were discontinued; No Way Out 2007 was the promotion's final PPV to be brand-exclusive during the first brand extension. "WWE" became an orphaned initialism for the promotion in April 2011 and the brand extension ended that August before No Way Out's one-off return in June 2012.

History
No Way Out was first held as an In Your House pay-per-view (PPV) event. In Your House was a series of monthly PPVs first produced by the World Wrestling Federation (WWF, now WWE) in May 1995. They aired when the promotion was not holding one of its major PPVs and were sold at a lower cost. The first No Way Out event was held as the 20th In Your House PPV on February 15, 1998, and was titled No Way Out of Texas: In Your House as it took place at the Compaq Center in Houston, Texas.

After the In Your House branding was retired following February 1999's St. Valentine's Day Massacre: In Your House, No Way Out branched off as its own PPV in February 2000, with the event's title truncated to "No Way Out" as it was not held in Texas. The event in turn became the promotion's annual February PPV. After Elimination Chamber matches were featured at the 2008 and 2009 events, the promotion ran a survey in September 2009 indicating a possible renaming for No Way Out. Voted by fans via the promotion's website, Elimination Chamber became the name of the February 2010 pay-per-view event, winning against Heavy Metal, Battle Chamber, Chamber of Conflict, and the original No Way Out name. Despite the poll, it was later announced that Elimination Chamber would not be considered as part of the No Way Out chronology and would instead be a new chronology, which in turn became the annual February PPV. The 2010 Elimination Chamber PPV was still promoted in Germany as No Way Out because of concerns that the "elimination chamber" name would bring back imagery of the gas chambers that were used in extermination camps during World War II. No Way Out returned as a one-off PPV in June 2012 (titled No Escape in Germany) and featured a traditional steel cage match; it replaced Capitol Punishment for the June 2012 PPV slot. In 2013, however, No Way Out was again discontinued with the June slot being given to Payback.

In May 2002, the WWF was renamed to World Wrestling Entertainment (WWE) as a result of a lawsuit from the World Wildlife Fund over the "WWF" initialism. Also around this time, the promotion held a draft that split its roster into two distinctive brands of wrestling, Raw and SmackDown!, where wrestlers were exclusively assigned to perform—a third brand, ECW, was added in 2006. No Way Out 2003 had featured wrestlers from both brands, but from 2004 to 2007, No Way Out was held exclusively for wrestlers of the SmackDown! brand. Following WrestleMania 23 in April 2007, WWE discontinued brand-exclusive PPVs. No Way Out 2007 was in turn the promotion's final PPV to be brand-exclusive during the first brand extension, with the events in 2008 and 2009 featuring wrestlers from the Raw, SmackDown, and ECW brands. Before No Way Out's one-off return in June 2012, the promotion ceased using its full name in April 2011, with "WWE" becoming an orphaned initialism, and the first brand extension ended that August. However, the event is expected to be revived in 2024.

Events

See also
 List of WWE pay-per-view events

References

External links
 Official No Way Out website

 
Recurring events established in 1998
Recurring events disestablished in 2009